Heartland is an album by the Michael Stanley Band released in 1980. It reached #86 on the Billboard 200 album chart in 1981. The album stayed in the top 100 for over eight weeks and was in the top 200 for an additional ten weeks.

Recording and release
Arguably the biggest album of the Cleveland, Ohio–based rock group, Heartland was released in 1980, after the band was dropped from Arista Records following their mediocre-charting Greatest Hints album. The band was not  convinced that they could come back from a fall down the charts, as Greatest Hints only reached number #148 on the Billboard magazine album chart. The band continued on without a label and recorded the album that would become their US breakthrough, Heartland. The band planned to release the masterwork independently, however, EMI America Records picked up both the band and the Heartland album upon its completion. The album peaked at #86 in Billboard in 1981.

Chart successes and fallout
Heartland proved to be the album the band had been waiting since the 1970s to see. However, speculation regarding lack of touring, limited radio play, weak support from EMI America, and the band being exhausted from trying year after year to crack the top of the charts have been blamed for the apparent fall that occurred after the Heartland bonanza the band enjoyed.

Singles
The album spawned the band's highest-charting single, "He Can't Love You", which reached #33 on the Billboard Hot 100 chart in 1981. The song features a surging sax lick by Clarence Clemons that makes it instantly recognizable. The album featured another single, "Lover", rising to a respectable #68 on the charts and staying there for over two weeks. It featured the iconic lyric "thank God for the man who put the white lines on the highway", which is still sung back by the audiences to Stanley whenever he performs the song live.

Weekly charts

"He Can't Love You" was #92 in the Canadian Top 100 Singles of 1981.

Aftermath
Although MSB went on to more chart successes after Heartland, which the band considered to be its definitive album, MSB never again fully felt the instantaneous relief following the release of Heartland. The band's next album, North Coast, released in 1981 would go on to top the chart position of Heartland surging up to the #79 spot. After the first two successful EMI America albums, the third, MSB, released in 1982, stalled at #136 on the Billboard album chart, failing to crack the top 100.

Track listing

Personnel 
Michael Stanley Band
Michael Stanley – lead and backing vocals, electric and acoustic guitars, percussion
Kevin Raleigh – lead and backing vocals, organ, piano, percussion
Michael Gismondi – bass, synthesizer
Gary Markasky – lead electric guitars
Bob Pelander – piano, organ, electric piano, synthesizer, orchestra bells, percussion, vocals
Tommy Dobeck – drums, percussion
Danny Powers – lead guitar and vocals on live bonus tracks

Additional performers
Clarence Clemons – saxophone
Dan Montecalvo – choke

Production
Produced by the Michael Stanley Band
Engineered by Arnie Rosenberg and Paul Schwartz, assisted by Lydia Terrion
Mixed by Fred Mollin, Michael Verdick, and the Michael Stanley Band
Mastered by Mike Reese
Art direction by Bob Rath; Reissue art direction by Kristian Lawing
Photography by Anastasia Pantsios and Dan Montecalvo

References

External links 

1980 albums
Michael Stanley Band albums
EMI America Records albums